La Semiramide riconosciuta (Semiramis Revealed) is an opera by the composer Christoph Willibald Gluck. It takes the form of a dramma per musica in three acts. The Italian-language libretto is by Pietro Metastasio. The opera premiered on 14 May 1748 at the Burgtheater in Vienna.

Sources
Holden, Amanda The Viking Opera Guide (Viking, 1993), page 372.

1748 operas
Italian-language operas
Operas by Christoph Willibald Gluck
Opera world premieres at the Burgtheater
Operas